North Carolina's 43rd Senate district is one of 50 districts in the North Carolina Senate. It has been represented by Republican Brad Overcash since 2023.

Geography
Since 2003, the district has covered most of Gaston County. The district overlaps with the 108th, 109th, and 110th state house districts.

District officeholders since 2003

Election results

2022

2020

2018

2016

2014

2012

2010

2008

2006

2004

2002

References

North Carolina Senate districts
Gaston County, North Carolina